The 1889 New Jersey gubernatorial election was held on November 5, 1889. Democratic nominee Leon Abbett defeated Republican nominee Edward Burd Grubb Jr. with 51.37% of the vote.

General election

Candidates
Leon Abbett, former Governor of New Jersey (Democratic)
Edward Burd Grubb Jr., iron magnate and Civil War veteran (Republican)
George M. La Monte, paper manufacturer (Prohibition)

Results

References

1889
New Jersey
1889 New Jersey elections
November 1889 events